Nicolas Petrovic (born 21 November 1969) is a French-Yugoslavian businessman and the Chief Executive of Siemens France since 2018.

Early life
He was born in Saint-Germain-en-Laye, near Paris, to a French mother and a Yugoslav father (Petrović is the common spelling). He has an older and younger sister. He gained a degree from ESCP Europe in 1991. He worked overseas for two years for Compagnie Générale des Eaux. He gained a degree from INSEAD in 2003.

Career
Petrovic joined SNCF in 1994 as a junior marketing manager. He resigned from SNCF in 2000 to pursue a degree from INSEAD, which he gained in 2003.

Eurostar
Petrovic joined Eurostar in August 2003 as Director of Customer Service. He became Chief Operating Officer (directeur général de l’exploitation d'Eurostar) in 2006, and replaced Richard Brown as the Chief Executive (directeur général d'Eurostar) in April 2010. Eurostar has 1,700 employees, with 850 in London.

Siemens
He was CEO (Président) of Siemens France from March 2018 to September 2021. The company has 6,000 employees and a turnover of 1.8 billion euros in France in the fiscal year 2021.

References

External links
 Eurostar
 Interview with Rail Europe

1969 births
Living people
French businesspeople in transport
ESCP Europe alumni
Eurostar
French chief executives
French people of Yugoslav descent
INSEAD alumni
People from Saint-Germain-en-Laye